Helicotricha is a monotypic genus of gastropods belonging to the family Hygromiidae. The only species is Helicotricha carusoi.

The species inhabits terrestrial environments.

References

Hygromiidae